The Stamping Ground is the eleventh studio album by Scottish Celtic rock band Runrig, released on 6 May 2001 on Ridge Records. The album marks the final appearance of keyboardist Peter Wishart, who departed from the band to follow a career in politics.

A copy of the album was aboard STS-107, and it was among the personal effects that were recovered following the reentry destruction of Space Shuttle Columbia on 1 February 2003. The song "Running to the Light" had been used for astronaut Laurel Clark's wake-up call during the mission.

Track listing
 "Book of Golden Stories" - 3:52
 "The Stamping Ground" - 5:25
 "An Sabhal aig Nèill" (Neil's Barn) - 3:21
 "Wall of China" / "One Man" - 3:49
 "The Engine Room" - 3:23
 "One Thing" - 5:01
 "The Ship" - 6:05
 "The Summer Walkers" - 4:50
 "Running to the Light" - 5:00
 "Òran Ailein"  (Alan's Song) / "Leaving Strathconon" - 6:00
 "Big Songs of Hope and Cheer" - 4:26
 "Òran" (Song) - 5:31

Personnel
Runrig
Iain Bayne - drums, percussion
Bruce Guthro - lead vocals
Malcolm Jones - guitars, accordion
Calum Macdonald - percussion
Rory Macdonald - vocals, bass guitar
Peter Wishart - keyboards
Additional musicians
Jon Anderskou - cello
Michael Bannister - Mellotron
Alyth MacCormack - vocals
Aidan O'Rourke - fiddle
Robin Rankin - keyboards
Betina Stegmann - fiddle

References 

Runrig albums
2001 albums
Scottish Gaelic music